Muraenichthys is a genus of eels in the snake eel family Ophichthidae.

Species
There are currently 8 recognized species in this genus:
 Muraenichthys gymnopterus (Bleeker, 1853)
 Muraenichthys hattae D. S. Jordan & Snyder, 1901 
 Muraenichthys malabonensis Herre, 1923 
 Muraenichthys philippinensis L. P. Schultz & Woods, 1949 (Philippines worm eel)
 Muraenichthys schultzei Bleeker, 1857 (Maimed worm eel)
 Muraenichthys sibogae M. C. W. Weber & de Beaufort, 1916 (Siboga worm eel)
 Muraenichthys thompsoni D. S. Jordan & R. E. Richardson, 1908 (Thompson's worm eel)
 Muraenichthys velinasalis Hibino & Kimura, 2015 (Curtain-nose worm eel)

References

Ophichthidae